Warsaw Radom Airport , also known as Radom-Sadków Airport is a civil and military airport in central Poland, located approximately  east of Radom city center and  from Warsaw. The name "Sadków" comes from the suburb of Radom in which the airport is located. The airport has been in operation since the 1920s. The airport has one 2000x45m (6,562x147,6 ft) runway. The middle section is asphalt concrete, with 200m and 230m end sections of concrete. Taxiways are 14 meters wide and were renovated in the year 2000.

History

Military Airport
Airport construction started in May 1929 to serve as a training facility for the first Polish civilian pilot training school.
In April 1932, it was handed over to the Ministry of Military Affairs (the equivalent of the Polish Ministry of National Defence at the time), which expanded the facility by buying more land; building hangars, barracks and a shooting range; and started training military pilots and paratroopers.
Training continued until World War II.

During the War's first days, German forces bombed the airport, destroying aircraft and hangars and causing the personnel to evacuate. During the occupation of Poland, the Luftwaffe used it for training and preparation of German pilots for battle on the Eastern Front. By the end of the war, the airport was mined and heavily damaged. The Polish military returned to Sadków in March 1945 and since then pilot training has continued until today.

Regional Airport 2014-2018
On 30 June 2006, Gmina Radom established Port Lotniczy Radom S.A. with a 22 million zloty budget to prepare Radom-Sadków for civilian operations. It became the airport operator on 24 January 2007. At the end of January 2011, a free-lease agreement for a  civilian and military joint use airport area was signed.
In September that year, the Polish Civil Aviation Office issued a permit for civilian operations after fulfilling Chicago Convention requirements.
In January 2012, works on an airport lighting project commenced.

In July 2012, the airport has acquired the former Terminal 2 building of Łódź Airport together with all its equipment for 2 mln zł. Its re-assembly started in January 2013 and was completed in March 2014. It is able to serve two Boeing 737 or Airbus A320 class aircraft at the same time.

Radom city council adapted the military airport in Sadków to serve domestic and international flights and was issued with a civilian airport certificate by the Civil Aviation Office in May 2014.

The Polish Air Navigation Services Agency installed a DVOR/DME navigation system at the airport in December 2014.

Initial scheduled operations
In May 2015, one year after the certification, AirBaltic was the first airline to announce scheduled flights from Radom. The Latvian carrier scheduled three weekly flights to its home base in Riga with Bombardier Q400, starting on September 1.

Czech Airlines was the second carrier to announce flights out of Radom in July 2015. The airline filed three-weekly flights from Radom to its hub in Prague using ATR 42 aircraft starting on 18 September.

Both carriers commenced the flights as planned. Loads were very low. Overall, the airport handled some 220 passengers in September, equal to six travelers on each flight.
Czech Airlines decided to discontinue its flights from and to Radom with effect of late October, that had an average load of three passengers. The suspension was officially caused by the lack of de-icing equipment.
airBaltic followed and announced on short notice to cancel its services and end its co-operation with the airport from November 18 onwards. According to Wyborcza, flights to Riga even got surpassed by flights on the Prague route in terms of success.
airBaltic hereby left the airport without any scheduled flights less than just three months after they had begun.

Resumption of flights
On 11 December 2015, Polish press informed that flights to Prague out of Radom would already resume on 20 December. Initially, the carrier would offer one rotation on Saturdays, before adding a second rotation on Fridays from 8 January. On 1 February, thrice-weekly frequency on Mondays were started. Flights were chartered through Radom and were due to operate with an ATR 42 and 72. Instead of a direct flight, the connection was operated as an add-on to Czech Airline's existing services to Ostrava, meaning that the plane would make a brief stop in Ostrava on both directions. The distance between Radom an Ostrava is 180 miles while the route from Ostrava and Prague is 174 miles, adding up to 354 miles. In comparison, the direct line between Radom and Prague is 317 miles long. Flights between Ostrava and Radom alone were not put on sale.

Operations commenced as scheduled. The first service saw an occupation of the passengers to Radom while there were no travelers on the return flight. The agreement only was valid until 22 February with an extension possible in case of success. No extension was made.

The airport was thereby left again without any scheduled flights by 22 February 2016.

SprintAir revives airport 2016; leaves again 2017
On 26 February 2016, Polish regional airline SprintAir announced it would commence operations from Radom in collaboration with the airport. From 18 April, the carrier based one Saab 340 aircraft at Radom Airport for flights to Berlin Tegel, Gdańsk, Prague and Wroclaw. All routes were being served twice-weekly with the exception of Gdansk which had one rotation a week. Fares on domestic flights started at 99 PLN per direction, and 149 PLN on international routes.
The contract was extended on 25 May to also cover flights from 20 June on with a changed schedule. All four destinations were kept, although Prague operations were reduced to once per week. From 23 June, there were two flights per week to Lviv airport.

All remaining SprintAir flights were terminated on 30 October 2017, after the two parties could not agree on a further extension of their agreement. Thereby, the airport again was left without any scheduled flights. The airport stated it was in talks with other airlines and the airport would be left open. However, the local airport never again saw scheduled passenger operations.

On 1st January 2019, Radom airport closed for good in order to allow for the construction of the new Warsaw-Radom airport. Demolition of existing terminal and other facilities started in May 2019, as the area would be used for the new airport. Thereby, the local airport ceased to exist after only a very few years of existence. Over the time, the local government had poured substantial budget into both developing and operating the loss-making facility as well to fund short-lived scheduled flight connections that were commercially unviable.

Warsaw-Radom Low-Cost Airport
Despite the failed establishment a successful regional airport, the premises soon saw an integral redevelopment as government-owned Polish Airports State Enterprise (PPL) decided to rebuild the airport as the new low-cost airport of Warsaw. It is important to note, that PPL did not hold any shares in the previous Radom regional airport despite owning and operating the largest airport in the country, Warsaw Chopin, and having substantial shares in all other civil passenger airports in Poland. The previous commercial passenger traffic attempts were entirely funded and by the regional government.

The development of the new low-cost airport included the demolishing of the previous terminal and passenger infrastructure as the entire site was redeveloped from scratch. Furthermore, the runway was rebuild together with further airport facilities. The airport demolition and rebuilding will provide the newly redone airport with the following infrastructure:

One pier terminal without jetways with 11 aircraft stands
Runway extension from the current 2000 metres to 2500 metres (6560ft to 8202ft)
Upgrade of the parallel taxiway to be capable of handling commercial traffic

Project and opposition
The city of Warsaw is served by two airports:
 Warsaw Chopin Airport; the main airport located within the city within densely populated area. Handles chiefly legacy airline traffic and freight. 
 Warsaw Modlin Airport; the secondary airfield of Warsaw. Used almost exclusively by Ryanair, it is a former Cold War-era airbase converted into Warsaw's current low-cost/alternative airport.

In November 2017, the Polish government approved plans to replace Chopin Airport with an entirely new Airport, the New Central Polish Airport. With an anticipated construction time of ten years and budgeted cost of USD 9.6bn, it is to become one of Europe´s largest airport sites. Its capacity is to reach up to 100 million passengers a year once fully developed.

Roughly at the same time, PPL decided to develop the site of Radom as a relief airport for crowded Chopin Airport.

The plan and following decision to establish the site as a future relief airport for Warsaw was heavily criticized by the airlines intended to use the facility.

Construction
Construction of the new site started in May 2019. Initially, it was slated to open in late 2020. The construction of the terminal building officially ended in August 2022. The total cost of the new facilities is 800 million zloty.

Name
The airport's official name Lotnisko Warszawa-Radom im. Bohaterów Radomskiego Czerwca 1976 Roku (eng. Heroes of Radom's June 1976 Warsaw Radom Airport), in honor of June 1976 events, was unveiled on May 7th, 2019.

Airlines and destinations 
The following airlines operate regular scheduled and charter flights to and from Warsaw Radom Airport:

Statistics

Ground transportation

Bus
The airport is currently served by bus route 14, running at 20-30 minute intervals, stopping at the airport's terminal during operation times.

Road access

Rail
An existing rail line from Radom railway station to the airport grounds near the terminal could be used for passenger service in the future. Temporary passenger rail services have been operated for the Radom Air Show.

See also
 List of airports in Poland

References

External links

Official website

Airports in Poland
Buildings and structures in Radom